Unorthodox is the debut studio album by Mexican-American rapper Snow Tha Product. It was released on October 26, 2011, by her independently-incorporated affiliated record labels Street Science Entertainment and Product ENT. The album was preceded by the release of her second mixtape, titled Unorthodox 0.5 (hosted by DJ Whoo Kid); including some of these songs that were linked for the album. These accompanied music videos were released from the album; including "Drunk Love", "Woke Wednesday" and "Holy Shit", and all these videos has nearly shifted 3 million views on YouTube, as of June 2013.

Track listing 
All lyrics were written by Snow Tha Product

References 

Hip hop albums by American artists
2011 debut albums